Thirsk School and Sixth Form College is a secondary school located in Sowerby, a village adjoining Thirsk, North Yorkshire, England.

Thirsk School has nearly 1,200 pupils, including about 200 in the sixth form.

The headteacher is Emma Lambden who took over in 2018 from the former head, Stuart Mason, when he left to take up a senior post in Norfolk.

School performance

In 2012 an Ofsted inspection rated Thirsk School as Grade 2 (good) for all areas and overall effectiveness.

As of 2021, the school's most recent inspection was in 2017, with a judgement of Good.

In 2019, the proportion of pupils entering the English Baccalaureate was 67%, considerably above the average for North Yorkshire and for England. The proportion achieving Grade 5 or above in English and maths GCSEs was 38%, considerably below the average for North Yorkshire and for England. The Attainment 8 score was in line with the average for North Yorkshire and for England.

The average A Level grade in 2019 was C, compared to an average of C+ in North Yorkshire and in England. The A Level progress score was below average.

Extracurricular activities

School extracurricular activities include music, sport and drama. The school has its own newspaper, The Falcon. Under the previous name of T.S. Times, the school paper was named the best secondary school newspaper in the country, in a competition run by First News.

Notable former pupils
 Ben Coad (born 1994), English cricketer
 Alfie McCalmont (born 2000), Northern Irish footballer
 John Rankin Waddell (born 1966), fashion photographer

References

External links
Thirsk School web site

Secondary schools in North Yorkshire
Community schools in North Yorkshire
Thirsk